CasaShopping is a shopping mall specialized in furniture's stores, interior design, home decoration in Brazil. It is located in the Barra da Tijuca neighborhood of Rio de Janeiro. It opened on September 28, 1984.

References

External links
 CasaShopping.com

Shopping malls in Rio de Janeiro (city)